Paek Nam-un (11 February 1894 – 12 June 1979) was an economist, educator and politician during the Japanese colonial period and following the establishment of the Democratic People's Republic of Korea. He was a professor of economics at Yeonhee College and an economic theorist of the Communist Party of Korea, and a representative figure of socialist economists during the Japanese colonial period along with Lee Soon-Tak. After the independence, on the premise of some asset class and solidarity, in the article 'The Path of the Chosun People's', 'Combination of New Democracy (National Unification Front)' was proposed. After liberation, Kim Doo-bong, Heo Jeong-suk, and Choi Chang-ik connected with Nam Joseon New Democratic Party and Nationalist Democratic Front, but did not come down after coming to North Korea with Kim Gu, Kim Kyu-sik, Jang Geon-sang in April 1948. Since then, he served as the first literary statue of the Democratic People's Republic of Korea and the chairman of the Supreme People's Assembly.

Biography

Early life
Born in Gochang-gun, Jeonbuk Province in 1894. In 1912, at the age of 19, he entered Suwon Agriculture and Forestry School. The school was free of tuition, was able to live in a dormitory, and Nam Wun Baek was even subsidized in tuition, so he was able to concentrate on his studies. After graduating from Suwon Agricultural and Forestry School in 1915, he was appointed as a teacher at Ganghwa Normal School in accordance with the mandatory regulations.

After working for two years at this school, he received a telegram as an engineer of the Ganghwa-gun Forestry Cooperative and worked again for one year. He wandered worrying about the future of this period and decided to study in Japan for a new intellectual desire. In 1918, he went to Japan to study, graduated from Tokyo High School of Commerce and Tokyo University of Commerce (now Hitotsubashi University).

After graduating from Tokyo University in 1925, he returned to Korea and became a professor at Yonhee College. During this period, in 1925, the Communist Party of Korea was founded in secret. Although communism had already been introduced to Korea, which had fallen into a colony, even after the founding of the Communist Party of Korea and the Korean Studies Movement in the 1920s, the Governor-General of Japan made a series of suppression of the communist movement and the Korean history of restructuring. Nevertheless, socialism was persistently spreading in connection with the anti-Japanese movement.

Late Japanese colonial period
He stood in the position of Marx's antiquities and class struggle theory and lectured on the history of Joseon, criticizing and refuting the 'identity theory' of the colonial consulate, and along with the lecture activities, he wrote books, Korea Social Economic History in 1933 and Korea Feudal Society in 1937 about economic history. On the other hand, Paek Nam-un was attacked intensively by people in the autonomous movement when he published several criticisms of autonomy asserted by national reformists from a nationalist perspective.

As his reputation as an economist became known, there were many students following him, and Nam Woon Baek led a socialist student club called the Economic Research Society. However, the Japanese imprisoned him and imprisoned him for more than two years. Released in 1940, he later lived in seclusion in addition to interacting with scholars.

After liberation
With Nam Wun Baek, on August 15, 1945, first founded the Korea Academy and became professor of the Faculty of Law, Kyungsung University. He then devoted progressive or socialist scholars to supporting the theory of building a new nation.
In December 1945, when the Moscow 3-phase conference was announced, he first declared a return in the name of the president of the Korea Academy and insisted on it through lectures, but later turned to a stand and supported the stand.

From this point on, Paek Nam-un began to work on the political front. He was independence movement in Yan'an, China, and had a certain connection with Hangul scholar Kim Doo-bong, who returned to the north of the 38th parallel, Choi Chang-ik of the Korean Independent Alliance, and Jung-sook Heo. Paek Nam-un organized the Gyeongseong Special Committee of the Korean Independent Alliance and became Chairman. Then, with the consent of Kim Doo-bong, a party called the Nam Josun New Democratic Party was founded and progressively reorganized to become the party leader. Connected with Kim Doo-bong, Heo Jung-sook, and Choi Chang-ik, and worked with the Namjosun New Democratic Party in the National Democracy Front in February 1946.

New Democratic Party Activities
He has been to the north of the 38th parallel twice as a representative of the New Democratic Party of Namjosun. In addition, the Korean military campaigned for unification in the midst of US military campaigns. Thus, the New Korea People's Party, the People's Party of Korea, and the Communist Party of Korea were worthy to form the South Korean Workers' Party. On February 15, 1946, he was invited to the co-chair of the Nationalist National Front (Minjeon). He left the street without joining the Namro Party, led by Park Heon-young, and through this, he had a conflict and confrontation with Park Heon-young. During this process, he felt skeptical and declared resignation in front of the barriers of reality. After that, he organized the National Culture Research Center and participates in cultural movements. However, in April 1947, six months after the retirement of the political system, the government returned to the political system. After announcing an article against the establishment of a single government, he collaborated with Yeon-hyung Yeo to join the founding of the People's Party of Korea. In May 1947, he was appointed Vice-Chairman of the People's Party of Korea. However, on July 19, when Yeon-hyung was assassinated, he could no longer maintain his organization. In August 1947, a wave of left-wing arrest arrested Paek Nam-un in a crisis of being arrested with the party. Eventually, Nam Woon Baek faces a threat of personal affairs, and first brings the family to North Korea.

By the time he was studying in Japan, he was strongly influenced by Marxism in the intellectual class in Japan, and there were many socialist economists, especially in Tokyo. From this point on, it is estimated that Paek Nam-un naturally leaned toward Marxism.

On May 10, 1948, the general election was scheduled to go north or south of South Korea. At the crossroads, Paek Nam-un chose to participate in the inter-Korean negotiations with Kim Gu, criticizing the establishment of the 'South Korea Bay Government' and the May 10 general election. In April 1948, he attended the Pyongyang Inter-Korean Conference. At this conference, he first gave a speech following Kim Il-sung and Park Heon-young, and at the third meeting he was also the moderator.

He was the twelfth northbound and the last northbound to go north to participate in inter-Korean negotiations. After that, he sat down in Pyongyang after the inter-Korean negotiations.

North Korea
Between August–September 1948, he was the 1st Expeditionary Member of the Supreme People's Assembly of the Democratic People's Republic of Korea. He was appointed as the first Education Minister in the North Korean Cabinet led by Premier Kim Il-sung and served for eight years. He also served as President of the Academy of Sciences of North Korea. Afterwards, the distance from the coastal group was safe when Kim Doo-bong and Choi Chang-ik were purged and Hur Jeong-suk was displaced in 1961. Later he served as the Vice Chairman of the Standing Committee of the Supreme People's Assembly in 1961–62, the Central Committee of the Korean Workers' Party, Marx Leninist Broadcasting University. He became the President of the Supreme People's Assembly in 1967, and the Chairman of the National Democratic Front of Korea in 1974.

Paek Nam-un acted as an intermediary for North Korea's intellectuals. On his first trip to the Northern part of Korea in January 1946, he was asked by the Democratic People's Republic of Korea to arrange for North Korea, such as a professor of South Korean scientists and artists, and returned to Seoul, inviting intellectuals to historian Kim Seok-hyung and Park Si-hyung, textile industry authority physicist, physicist It is known that Sang-rok Do, engineer Jae-woo Choi and Young-chang Kang, and artists Yeol-bong Moon, Chul-hwan Hwang, and Young-sin Park were arranged.

He was elected to the Central Committee of the Workers' Party of Korea in 1961, and was elected chairman of the Supreme People's Assembly in 1967, serving in that post until 1972. After that, he served as chairman of the Democratic Front of the Fatherland and died in 1979 at the age of 86.

References

Workers' Party of Korea politicians
Korean communists
1894 births
1979 deaths
People from North Jeolla Province
People from Gochang County
Government ministers of North Korea
Members of the 1st Supreme People's Assembly
Members of the 2nd Supreme People's Assembly
Members of the 3rd Supreme People's Assembly
Members of the 4th Supreme People's Assembly
Members of the 5th Supreme People's Assembly
South Korean emigrants to North Korea